Khanpur  is a village in Chanditala II community development block of Srirampore subdivision in Hooghly district in the Indian state of West Bengal.

Geography
Chanditala police station serves this Village.

Gram panchayat
Villages and census towns in Barijhati gram panchayat are: Barijhati, Beledanga, Gokulpur, Khanpur, Makhalpara and Thero.

Demographics
As per 2011 Census of India, Khanpur had a total population of 3,427 of which 1 ,582 (46%) were males and 1,845 (54%) were females. Population below 6 years was 360. The total number of literates in Khanpur was 2,559 (83.44% of the population over 6 years).

References 

Villages in Chanditala II CD Block